Nuteh may refer to:
Nütəh, Azerbaijan
Nuteh, Iran